SLKB Komarno is a Slovak shipbuilding company which was founded at the end of the 19th century.  A modern shipyard was built in the town by the Hugo Wellisch company, where ship repairs started in November, 1898. Now, SLKB Shipyard is the only Slovak shipyard that specializes in the construction of multi-purpose river and seagoing cargo vessels of up to 8,000 TDW.

External links
 Slovak shipyard

Shipbuilding companies
Shipyards of Europe
Manufacturing companies of Czechoslovakia